Bombino may refer to:

Bombino bianco, an Italian wine grape variety grown in Apulia
Bombino nero, an Italian wine grape variety grown in Apulia, Basilicata, Lazio, and Sardinia
Bombino (musician), Nigerien singer-songwriter and guitarist